This is a summary of 1980 in music in the United Kingdom, including the official charts from that year.

Events 
unknown date – John Rutter is made an honorary Fellow of Westminster Choir College, Princeton.
1 January - Cliff Richard is appointed an MBE by Elizabeth II.
16 January - Paul McCartney is arrested in Tokyo for possession of a half pound of marijuana. The remaining part of McCartney's tour has to be cancelled.
25 January - Paul McCartney is released from a Japanese jail and ejected from the country by Japanese authorities.
8 February - David Bowie and his wife of nearly 10 years, Angie, file for divorce. Bowie gets custody of their 9-year-old son, Zowie
30 April - The Roger Daltrey film, McVicar, opens in London.
18 May - Ian Curtis, vocalist of pioneering post-punk group Joy Division, hangs himself in his Macclesfield home. His death comes just days before Joy Division are scheduled to begin their first U.S. tour.
14 July - Malcolm Owen of English punk rock band The Ruts is found dead in the bathroom of his parents' house in Hayes, from a heroin overdose.
16 September - Kate Bush becomes the first British female artist to reach No.1 in the album charts.
20 September - Ozzy Osbourne's breakthrough debut album Blizzard of Ozz is released in the UK.
25 November - ABBA score the last of their nine number one singles in the UK Charts.
December - Duran Duran signs with EMI after finalizing its lineup and touring as a support act for Hazel O'Connor.
4 December - Led Zeppelin disbands following the death of drummer John Bonham.
8 December - John Lennon is shot dead outside his apartment building in New York City. His latest single, "(Just Like) Starting Over", subsequently becomes a number one hit.

Pop music 
The 1980s got off to an odd start with a very varied list of artists reaching No. 1 in the singles chart.  Kenny Rogers, The Jam and Odyssey were among those vying for the top position. The Guinness Book of British Hit Singles & Albums stated that the year had a very dated appearance, because of a number of songs reaching No. 1 which had been recorded years previously, such as the "Theme from M*A*S*H*" and Don McLean's cover of Roy Orbison's "Crying". The Ska and Mod revivals reached their peak this year, with strong chart showings by The Jam, The Specials and Madness. 1970s favourites ABBA and Blondie both had their last years as chart heavyweights, clocking up 5 No.1 singles between them. David Bowie scored his second No.1 this year, while the death of John Lennon at the end of the year gave him his first chart topper (and would dominate the early months of 1981). Kate Bush became the first British female artist to have a No.1 album, and The Police finished the year as the top selling act. "Brass in Pocket" by The Pretenders became the first number 1 single of the 80s (not counting "Another Brick in the Wall" by Pink Floyd" which was a holdover from 1979).

Charts

Number-one singles

Number-one albums

Year-end charts
The tables below include sales between 31 December 1979 and 31 December 1980: the year-end charts reproduced in the issue of Music Week dated 27 December 1980 and played on Radio 1 on 4 January 1981 only include sales figures up until 6 December 1980.

Best-selling singles

Best-selling albums

Classical music: new works
George Benjamin - Ringed by the Flat Horizon
Lennox Berkeley - Magnificat and Nunc dimittis, Op.99
Harrison Birtwistle - Clarinet Quintet
Jonathan Harvey - Mortuos Plango, Vivos Voco
Alun Hoddinott - The Heaventree of Stars
Robert Simpson - String Quartet No. 8
Malcolm Williamson - Ode for Queen Elizabeth

Opera
Peter Maxwell Davies
Cinderella (children's opera)
The Lighthouse
William Mathias - The Servants

Musical theatre
Suburban Strains, book and lyrics by Alan Ayckbourn with music by Paul Todd

Births
1 January - Richie Faulkner, rock guitarist (Judas Priest)
5 January - Lisa Gordon, drummer (Hepburn)
29 March - Andy Scott-Lee, singer (3SL)
4 April - Johnny Borrell, singer and musician with Razorlight
12 April - Brian McFadden, Irish singer (Westlife)
29 April - Kian Egan, Irish singer (Westlife)
8 May - Michelle McManus, singer and TV presenter
28 May - Mark Feehily, Irish singer (Westlife)
15 June - Lynsey Shaw, singer (Girls@Play)
23 June
Jessica Taylor, singer (Liberty X)
Andy Orr, Irish singer (Six)
29 June - Katherine Jenkins, soprano
7 July - Fyfe Dangerfield, singer-songwriter and guitarist (Guillemots and Senseless Prayer)
28 July - Noel Sullivan, singer (Hear'Say)
19 August - Darius Danesh, singer-songwriter and actor
5 September
Kevin Simm, singer (Liberty X)
Zainam Higgins, singer (Cleopatra)
6 September
Kerry Katona, TV presenter and singer (Atomic Kitten)
Jayde Delpratt, singer (Ultimate Kaos)
 10 September - Matthew Keaney, Irish singer (Reel)
 3 October - Danny O'Donoghue, Irish singer-songwriter (Mytown, The Script)
 9 November - Philip Gargan, Irish singer (Reel)
15 December - Sergio Pizzorno, guitarist with Kasabian
date unknown - Catrin Finch, harpist

Deaths
25 January - Queenie Watts, actress and singer, 53 (cancer)
18 February - Muriel Brunskill, operatic contralto, 80
19 February - Bon Scott, lead singer of AC/DC, 33 (alcohol poisoning)
4 May - Joe "Mr Piano" Henderson, pianist, 60
18 May - Ian Curtis, musician and singer (Joy Division), 23 (suicide)
5 July - A. J. Potter, composer (born 1918)
6 July - Frank Cordell, composer, arranger and conductor, 62
24 July - Peter Sellers, comic actor and singer ("Goodness Gracious Me"), 54 (heart attack)
25 September - John Bonham, drummer (Led Zeppelin), 32 (asphyxiation)
30 September - Horace Finch, pianist and organist, 74
27 October - Steve Peregrin Took, bongo player for Tyrannosaurus Rex, frontman for Shagrat and Steve Took's Horns, solo artist, 31 (asphyxiation)
8 December - John Lennon, singer, songwriter, and guitarist (The Beatles), 40 (murdered)

See also 
 1980 in British radio
 1980 in British television
 1980 in the United Kingdom

References 

 
British music
British music by year